The König class was a group of four dreadnought battleships built for the German  (Imperial Navy) in the early 1910s. The design for the ships was derived from the preceding , using the same basic hull but with a rearranged main battery of ten  guns in five twin-gun turrets to improve the guns' firing arcs. Instead of the staggered wing turrets used in the Kaisers, the Königs placed their main guns all on the centerline using superfiring pairs fore and aft. Budgetary constraints and the need to begin construction quickly to compete with Britain in the Anglo-German naval arms race prevented any more radical changes. Diesel engines were planned for the ships, but they could not be readied in time, so all four vessels reverted to steam turbines for their propulsion system.

As tensions in Europe spiraled out of control during the July Crisis in 1914, work on the ships was accelerated; all four ships were completed in the early months of World War I and they were rushed into service to join III Battle Squadron of the High Seas Fleet. They took part in a number of operations in the North Sea as support for the battlecruisers of I Scouting Group, including the Raid on Yarmouth and the Raid on Scarborough, Hartlepool, and Whitby in late 1914. The year 1915 passed uneventfully, as a series of sweeps into the North Sea failed to bring contact with elements of the British Royal Navy. All four ships were present at the Battle of Jutland on 31 May – 1 June 1916, where they formed the front of the German line of battle. As a result, they received numerous hits, with Kronprinz the only member of the class to avoid being damaged in the action.

As the German fleet shifted priorities to the U-boat campaign after Jutland, the surface fleet declined in significance, though major fleet elements were sent to the Baltic Sea in September 1917 to wage Operation Albion to secure several islands in the Gulf of Riga from Russian forces. König and Kronprinz took part in the Battle of Moon Sound there, where they damaged the Russian pre-dreadnought  and forced her scuttling. The four König-class ships saw little activity thereafter and plans for a final attack on the Royal Navy in October 1918 led to the Wilhelmshaven mutiny. All four ships were interned at Scapa Flow after the war, where they were scuttled on 21 June 1919. Grosser Kurfürst was raised in 1938 and broken up, but the other three vessels remain on the sea floor, where they remain popular diving sites.

Background

The König-class battleships were authorized in the context of the early-20th-century Anglo-German naval arms race, under the Second Amendment to the Naval Law, which had been passed in 1908 as a response to the revolution in naval technology created with the launch of the British  in 1906. Many of the world's navies began building their own dreadnought battleships, which were significantly larger—and correspondingly more expensive—than the old pre-dreadnought battleships. As a result, the funds that had been appropriated for the Navy in the First Amendment, passed in 1906, were going to be used up before they were scheduled to be replenished in 1911.

In the terms of the First Amendment to the Naval Law of 1906, Admiral Alfred von Tirpitz had requested but failed to secure funding for new battleships; they had now been approved by the  under the 1908 amendment. Along with appropriating funds to continue the pace of battleship construction prescribed under the Naval Law, the new amendment also increased the naval budget by an additional 1billion marks. Tirpitz had initially planned on building four new capital ships per year, including battlecruisers, but the increased cost of the new ships forced him to reduce the number of ships laid down per year to two beginning in the 1912 fiscal year and continuing through 1917.

As a result of Tirpitz's ultimatum, the bill was passed in March 1908 by a large margin. The  followed the Helgolands and replaced the remaining coastal defense ships, leaving the Brandenburgs as the next vessels to be replaced.

Design 

Conceptual work for the next class of battleship had already begun while the design for the Kaiser class was still being finalized. During a meeting on 15 January 1910, Tirpitz mandated that the new class must adhere to the price per ship he had budgeted, owing to the financial problems that had already disrupted his plans. The  (Construction Department, referred to as "K") was as that time occupied with work on the new battlecruiser , delaying the initiation of formal planning for what became the König design. (Vice Admiral) Adolf Paschen, the chief of "A", expressed a desire to rearrange the main battery guns to the centerline to maximize broadside fire, while Tirpitz reiterated his preference for diesel engines, though trials with the prototype engine for the center shaft of the Kaiser-class ship  were not yet completed.

During a series of three meetings in May 1910, further details were discussed, including adopting triple gun turrets for the main battery, following their adoption by the Austro-Hungarian Navy and other navies. Tirpitz again argued that at least one of the new ships should use a diesel engine. Hans Bürkner, the civilian "K" chief, preferred a simple development of Prinzregent Luitpold as that would entail minimal cost increases in accordance with Tirpitz's wishes. By the third meeting, the question of increasing the caliber was set aside as cost prohibitive; while the naval command believed that the existing  gun was sufficiently powerful at the expected battle ranges, they recognized that in the future, an increase in caliber would be unavoidable if Germany was to keep up with developments abroad. Owing to the pressing need to match British construction and keep costs within Tirpitz's budgetary constraints, the naval command decided to simply repeat the design for Prinzregent Luitpold with some of the improvements.

The design staff used the Kaiser hull form, but introduced several improvements, the most significant being the re-arrangement of the main battery. The two wing turrets were both moved to the centerline, one superfiring over the forward-most turret, and the other amidships between the funnels. The armor layout was also revised slightly to improve protection of the bow and stern. To offset the weight increase of these changes, a pair of  secondary guns and the stern torpedo tube were to be removed. "K" considered the adoption of anti-roll tanks to help stabilize the ships, as the recently completed Nassau-class battleships initially suffered from severe rolling, though Tirpitz eventually decided against them. By December 1910, the decision was made to retain all fourteen of the 15 cm guns and instead remove two of the  guns. Although initially intended to use diesel engines on their center shafts, delays in the completion of the prototype for Prinzregent Luitpold forced the Navy to return to the traditional all-turbine arrangement for the first member of the class. Partial oil-firing was introduced, which provided greater power for the turbines.

The first three ships—, and —were ordered for the 1911 program. Vulcan and Weser received contracts on 11 August, though the finalized orders were not issued until 12 October; final tinkering with the design continued, however, and Tirpitz's decision to abandon the anti-roll tanks came as late as 22 January 1912. It was still hoped that the diesels could still be installed aboard Grosser Kurfürst and Markgraf, but it was still not ready by the time work began on the vessels.

The increase in weight from the larger guns would be offset by reducing the secondary battery from 15 cm to  guns. The proposal was ultimately rejected in favor of building another vessel identical to the 1911 ships to create a homogeneous four-ship division to simplify tactical command. The naval command again hoped that the diesel engine would be ready in time for this vessel, so her propulsion system was redesigned with larger, more powerful turbines than her sisters received. But before work began, it became clear that the diesel would not be ready, so the center engine room—which had been left empty in Prinzregent Luitpold—was reconfigured to accept a third turbine. Only one significant change was introduced for the new ship, which became , was a larger tubular foremast that was capable of supporting a heavier fire direction top. This was later retrofitted to the other members of the class.

General characteristics 

As designed, the Königs displaced  normally, but at full load, they displaced . The hulls were constructed with transverse and longitudinal steel frames, over which the outer hull plates were riveted. The ships' hulls each contained eighteen watertight compartments and were equipped with a double bottom that ran for 88% of the length of the hull. A long forecastle deck ran from the stem to the aft superfiring barbette. The ships' superstructure was minimal, consisting of a set of forward and aft conning towers, though König was built as a squadron flagship and accordingly received a larger bridge to accommodate an admiral's staff. In 1917, Markgraf received an enlarged bridge similar to Königs as well. The first three ships were fitted with a pair of pole masts to support their spotting tops, though Kronprinz received a heavier tubular mast.

Steering was controlled by a pair of rudders placed side by side. German naval historian Erich Gröner said the German navy considered the ships to be "very good sea-boats", and that they possessed a gentle motion. They suffered a slight loss of speed in a swell, and with the rudders hard over, the ships lost up to 66% speed and heeled over 8 degrees. König, Grosser Kurfürst, Markgraf, and Kronprinz each had a standard crew of 41 officers and 1095 enlisted men; König, which became the flagship of III Battle Squadron, had an additional crew of 14 officers and another 68 sailors. While serving as a deputy command flagship, the ships carried an additional 2 officers and 24 enlisted men. The ships carried several smaller boats, including one picket boat, three barges, two launches, two yawls, and two dinghies.

Propulsion 
The ships of the class were equipped with three sets of steam turbines, each set consisting of a high and low-pressure turbine. The turbines were manufactured by Parsons for König and Kronprinz, Vulcan AG for Grosser Kurfürst, and Bergmann for Markgraf. The high and low-pressure turbines were grouped into their own engine rooms. Steam for the turbines was provided by fifteen Schulz-Thornycroft water-tube boilers, three of which burned oil and the remainder burning coal. These were divided into three boiler rooms, the first two of which were placed between the forward and center ammunition magazines for the main battery, venting into the forward funnel. The third boiler room was located aft of the center magazine, directly ahead of the engine rooms, and venting into the smaller aft funnel.

This was a result of the fact that the tests were run after the start of World War I and thus had to be conducted in the safer, but shallower, waters of the western Baltic Sea.

Armament 

The Königs were armed with a main battery of ten 30.5 cm SK L/50 guns in five twin turrets. Two turrets were mounted forward of the main superstructure in a superfiring pair, the third was placed on the centerline between the two funnels amidships, and the fourth and fifth turrets were arranged in another superfiring pair aft of the rear conning tower. The centerline arrangement was an improvement over the preceding Kaiser class, as all ten guns could fire on a wide arc on the broadside, and four guns could fire directly ahead, as opposed to only two on the Kaisers. The guns were supplied with 90 shells per gun, and they had a rate of fire of about three shots per minute. The barrels had an expected life of two hundred full-power shots before they would need to be replaced.

The guns were mounted in DrL C/11 turrets, which were electrically controlled, though the guns were elevated hydraulically. Each turret had a working chamber beneath it that was connected to a set of revolving ammunition hoists leading down to the magazine below it. One set of hoists retrieved the shells and propellant charges from the magazines and brought them to the working chamber, and  another transferred them up to the gun house through flash-tight doors; this arrangement was adopted to reduce the risk of fire in the gun house from reaching the magazines. In an effort to reduce the possibility of a fire, everything in the turret was constructed of steel.

Secondary armament consisted of fourteen 15 cm SK L/45 quick-firing guns, each mounted individually in casemates in the forecastle deck, seven guns per broadside. Each casemate had its own set of magazines and ammunition hoists. These guns were intended for defense against torpedo-armed destroyers, and were supplied with a total of 2,240 shells. Their rate of fire was 4 to 5 shots per minute.

The ships also carried six 8.8 cm SK L/45 quick-firing guns, mounted in casemates; previous German capital ships had carried a larger number of these guns, but by the time the König class was designed, the growth of destroyers had rendered the 8.8 cm gun of marginal use. The six guns were located on either side of the forward conning tower and were all directed forward. In addition, they were slated to carry four 8.8 cm SK L/45 anti-aircraft guns, which were to be mounted on either side of the rear conning tower. Production remained behind schedule and competing demands after the start of the war caused further delivery problems. Grosser Kurfürst received her original complement in 1915 and König and Kronprinz had two guns installed that year. Kronprinz had another pair installed by 1918, by which time Markgraf received two of the guns.

As was customary for capital ships of the dreadnought era, the ships were armed with five  submerged torpedo tubes, which were supplied with a total of sixteen torpedoes. One tube was mounted in the bow and the other four were placed on the broadside, two on each side of the ship. The torpedoes were the G7*** type, which carried a  warhead.

Fire control
The König-class carried a pair of  stereoscopic rangefinders to direct the fire of the main guns. These were mounted atop the main and aft conning towers, and ranging data was sent to a central command post that had a Bg-Mittler C/13 rangefinder equalizer that was used to filter out erroneous data and calculate ranges to determine the correct elevation of the guns. This information was then sent to the R.W. Geber C/13, a fire-control director, to communicate firing instructions to the guns. The artillery officer used his own periscope sight, which electronically communicated an indicator to the gunners in the turrets; the gunners used their own sights to point the turrets at the target indicated by the artillery officer.

Armor 
The general layout of the armor scheme for the König class was similar to that of the Kaiser class. The steel used for the ships' protection consisted of Krupp cemented armor. Forward of the central citadel, the belt thinned to 20 cm for a third of the way to the stem, and on the lower edge it tapered to 15 cm. Further forward, the main belt was reduced to 15 cm, being reduced to 12 cm on the bottom edge.

The forward deck was increased to 10 cm, while the stern received 6 to 10 cm of armor, increasing to 12 cm over the steering compartment. At upper deck level, a layer of  steel covered the central portion of the ship between the end barbettes. Another layer of 3 cm armor covered the forecastle deck over the secondary battery. Behind the belt, a  torpedo bulkhead ran the length of the hull, several meters behind the main belt; the bulkhead was designed to contain flooding that might result from torpedo or mine damage. It met the main armor deck where it began to slope down; above the deck, a 3 cm bulkhead extended upward as additional anti-splinter protection. The compartments created on either side of the torpedo bulkhead were used to store coal for the boilers, which reinforced the structure and helped to absorb blast effects; pumps were located amidships to drain these compartments in the event of flooding.

Above the upper belt and between the superfiring turret barbettes was an armored battery for the secondary gun casemates.

The forward conning tower was protected with heavy armor. Campbell also provides a thickness of 17 cm for the main tower roof.

Modifications
The four Königs received relatively minor modifications in their short service lives, all made between mid-1916 and late 1918. The first three ships had their fore masts replaced with the same tubular mast that Kronprinz received as completed. After the Battle of Jutland revealed the danger that dislodged anti-torpedo nets posed to the ships' screws, they were removed. They also had most of their low-angle 8.8 cm guns removed and their firing apertures plated over. König and Grosser Kurfürst retained two of those guns and the former had her anti-aircraft guns replaced with four low-angle mounts in 1918. Markgraf only had two of her low-angle guns removed in 1917, while Kronprinz retained hers for the duration of the war. Another pair of 3-meter rangefinders were installed in the forward- and aftmost main battery turrets, and later in the war, these were replaced with  rangefinders. An improved C/15 version of the Bg-Mittler system was installed, and Kronprinz and Grosser Kurfürst received an  C/16 gyroscopic stabilizing system for the main guns, which improved accuracy by accounting for the roll of the ships and changes in gun elevation as they moved through the water. König was to have received one as well, but it does not appear that she did, while Markgraf had an improved C/17 version installed.

Construction

Service history 

After the start of the war in July 1914, work on the vessels was accelerated so they would be available for operations as soon as possible. König and Grosser Kurfürst were completed in the first weeks of World War I; the latter had completed sea trials in time to take part in the Raid on Yarmouth on 3 November 1914, as part of the High Seas Fleet, which provided distant cover to the battlecruisers of I Scouting Group that carried out the raid. Grosser Kurfürst participated in the raid on Scarborough, Hartlepool, and Whitby on 15–16 December, again providing distant support to the battlecruisers. Grosser Kurfürst, assigned to III Battle Squadron, formed the vanguard of the German line of battle. During the operation on the morning of 16 December, the High Seas Fleet, commanded by Admiral Friedrich von Ingenohl, briefly clashed with the destroyer screen of the British 1st Battlecruiser Squadron and the 2nd Battle Squadron, which had been sent to intercept their German counterparts (as the British were able to decipher German codes thanks to a set of code books captured from the cruiser  in August). Ingenohl, under orders from the Kaiser not to risk the fleet and fearing he had located the scouts for the entire Grand Fleet, disengaged and returned to port.

Markgraf and Kronprinz both completed their trials in January 1915, after which they joined their sisters in III Battle Squadron. They took part in a series of sweeps into the North Sea that failed to locate British forces through 1915, by which time Ingenohl had been replaced by Admiral Hugo von Pohl. They also supported mine-laying operations in the North Sea and periodically rotated through the Baltic for periods of training. These operations continued into early 1916, when Pohl was in turn replaced by  Reinhard Scheer. The ships again provided cover for I Scouting Group when it bombarded Yarmouth and Lowestoft in April. When the Grand Fleet sortied in response to the raid, Scheer took the fleet back to port to avoid a confrontation with the numerically superior British fleet.

Battle of Jutland 

The four ships took part in the fleet sortie that resulted in the battle of Jutland on 31 May–1 June 1916. The operation again sought to draw out and isolate a portion of the Grand Fleet and destroy it before the main British fleet could retaliate. König, Grosser Kurfürst, Markgraf, and Kronprinz made up V Division of III Battle Squadron, and they were the vanguard of the fleet. III Battle Squadron was the first of three battleship units; directly astern were the Kaiser-class battleships of VI Division, III Battle Squadron. Astern of the Kaiser-class ships were the Helgoland and Nassau classes of the I Battle Squadron; in the rear guard were the elderly  pre-dreadnoughts of II Battle Squadron.

Shortly before 16:00 CET, the battlecruisers of I Scouting Group encountered the British 1st Battlecruiser Squadron, under the command of David Beatty. By this time, the German battlecruisers were steaming south in order to draw the British ships towards the main body of the High Seas Fleet. At 17:30, König, the leading German battleship, spotted both IScouting Group and the 1st Battlecruiser Squadron approaching. The German battlecruisers were steaming down to starboard, while the British ships steamed to port. At 17:45, Scheer ordered a two-point turn to port to bring his ships closer to the British battlecruisers, and a minute later at 17:46, the order to open fire was given.

Königs first salvos fell short of her target, and so she shifted her fire to the nearest British ship, Tiger. The two destroyers closed in on the German line and, having endured a hail of gunfire, maneuvered into a good firing position. Each ship launched two torpedoes apiece at König and Grosser Kurfürst, though all four weapons missed. In return, a secondary battery shell from one of the battleships hit Nestor and wrecked her engine room. The ship, along with the destroyer , was crippled and lying directly in the path of the advancing German line. Both destroyers were sunk, but German torpedo boats stopped to pick up survivors. At around 18:00, the four Königs shifted their fire to the approaching s of 5th Battle Squadron, though the firing lasted only a short time before the range widened too far.

Simultaneously, the British III and IV Light Cruiser Squadrons began a torpedo attack on the German line; while advancing to torpedo range, they smothered Wiesbaden with fire from their main guns. The Königs fired heavily on the British cruisers, but even sustained fire from the Germans' main guns failed to drive off the British cruisers. In the ensuing melee, the British armored cruiser  was struck by several heavy-caliber shells from the German dreadnoughts. One salvo penetrated the ship's ammunition magazines and, in a tremendous explosion, destroyed the cruiser. Another melee with the British cruisers developed an hour later, again over the crippled Wiesbaden; during this period, König received a hit aft that caused significant damage.

The four König-class ships, along with other capital ships—those that were still in fighting condition—had their fuel and ammunition stocks replenished in the inner harbor. Kronprinz was the only member of the class to emerge from the action undamaged.

Subsequent operations 

König, Grosser Kurfürst, and Markgraf underwent repairs through July and then conducted training in the Baltic in August before taking part in the sortie that led to the action of 19 August 1916; during the operation, Markgraf and Grosser Kurfürst were temporarily attached to I Scouting Group as several of its battlecruisers had been badly mauled at Jutland and were still under repair. Scheer intended to bombard the British coast, but broke off after he received reports that the Grand Fleet was at sea; in the inconclusive action, German U-boats sank a pair of British light cruisers, and in return one German battleship was damaged by a mine. Further bouts of training in the Baltic, along with fruitless sweeps into the North Sea continued through the rest of 1916. During an operation to recover a pair of U-boats that had grounded off the Danish coast, a British submarine torpedoed Grosser Kurfürst and Kronprinz, though both ships returned to port for repairs. In 1917, the heavy units of the High Seas Fleet were largely restricted to guard duty in the German Bight, as the strategic priority of the German fleet had shifted to the U-boat campaign. During this period, the ships underwent refits that included the installation of the heavy tubular foremasts that Kronprinz had received when initially completed.

In September, as the Imperial German Army prepared to attack the city of Riga in Russia, it requested assistance from the Navy to clear the Gulf of Riga to secure its seaward flank. The Navy transferred significant elements of the High Seas Fleet, including the four Königs, to conduct Operation Albion. The attack began on 12 October, with the German battleships bombarding Russian coastal batteries on the Sworbe peninsula. Grosser Kurfürst struck a mine but was able to remain in action. The next phase, the clearing of naval forces in the gulf, began four days later as König and Kronprinz led an attempt to break through Russian defenses. In the ensuing Battle of Moon Sound, the German battleships badly damaged Slava and forced her to scuttle, but the rest of the Russian vessels withdrew. By 20 October, the Germans had completed their objectives, including the Army's successful assault on Riga, allowing the fleet to return to the North Sea, though Markgraf was mined on the return voyage.

Fate 

The High Seas Fleet saw little significant activity for the rest of 1917 and into mid-1918, apart from routine training exercises and guard duties in the German Bight. In January 1918, Kronprinz was renamed Kronprinz Wilhelm in honor of Crown Prince William. The ships, less Markgraf, which was dry-docked for maintenance, took part in an abortive attempt to intercept a British convoy to Norway in late April. The ships suffered a series of accidents in 1918, including groundings, that required dry-docking for repairs. When rumors of the plan began to circulate among the fleet's crews, sailors began to desert in large numbers, leading to the  Wilhelmshaven mutiny, which forced Scheer and Hipper to cancel the operation.

Following the capitulation of Germany in November 1918, the majority of the High Seas Fleet, under the command of Rear Admiral Ludwig von Reuter, was interned in the British naval base at Scapa Flow. The fleet remained in captivity during the negotiations that ultimately produced the Versailles Treaty. It became apparent to Reuter that the British intended to seize the German ships on 21 June, which was the deadline for Germany to have signed the peace treaty. Unaware that the deadline had been extended to the 23rd, Reuter ordered his ships be sunk. On the morning of 21 June, the British fleet left Scapa Flow to conduct training maneuvers; at 11:20 Reuter transmitted the order to his ships. Of the four ships, Kronprinz was the first to sink in the scuttling of the German fleet in Scapa Flow. She slipped beneath the waters of Scapa Flow at 13:15. Grosser Kurfürst followed 15 minutes later at 13:30. König sank at approximately 14:00, but Markgraf did not sink until 16:45; she was one of the last capital ships to be successfully scuttled—only the battlecruiser  sank afterwards, at 17:00.

Grosser Kurfürst was eventually raised, on 29 April 1938. The ship was towed to Rosyth, where she was broken up for scrap metal. The other three ships remain on the sea floor, and were sold to Britain in 1962. The wrecks have been used as sources of low-background steel, which has occasionally been removed for use in scientific devices. The vessels are popular diving sites, and in 2017, marine archaeologists from the Orkney Research Center for Archaeology conducted extensive surveys of the wrecks. A diving contractor, Tommy Clark, came to own the three battleships and the light cruiser  in 1981, which he later placed for sale in 2019. König, Kronprinz, and Markgraf were all purchased by a Middle Eastern company.

Notes

Footnotes

Citations

References

Further reading

 
 

Battleship classes
 
World War I battleships of Germany